Ghidighici is a village in Chișinău municipality, Moldova.

It is the location of the Ghidighici Reservoir.

History

On November 1, 1942, King Michael I of Romania, his mother Helen, and Foreign Minister Mihai Antonescu joined the opening ceremony of the monumental  Liberation Tower in Ghidighici. The tower was destroyed in 1944, after the Soviet re-occupation.

References

External links

 Turnul dezrobirii Basarabiei de la Ghidighici
 Turnul Dezrobirii Basarabiei (Башня освобождения)
 (FOTO, VIDEO) Monumentul „Turnul Dezrobirii Basarabiei”
 Satul Ghidighici on CASATA.MD

Villages of Chișinău Municipality